Como gallos de pelea ("As Fighting Cocks") is a 1977 Mexican film. It stars Sara García and Valentin Trujillo.

Synopsis
For several years Altagracia has refused to sell the property to Fernando who has been harassing her, but when Carlos comes from the city, he decides to sell the property. Carlos discovers the atrocities made by Fernando and his accomplices while he discovers the amazing beauty of Maria so he decides to keep the property and defend it with his life.

External links
 

1977 films
Mexican comedy-drama films
1970s Spanish-language films
1970s Mexican films